Styggehøe or Styggehøi is a mountain on the border of Vågå Municipality and Nord-Fron Municipality in Innlandet county, Norway. The mountain is surrounded by several other notable mountains including Heimdalshøe to the southwest.

See also
List of mountains of Norway by height

References

Vågå
Nord-Fron
Mountains of Innlandet